Clear Creek Dam (National ID # WA00264) is a dam in Yakima County, Washington.

Raised another  feet in 1918 to its present height of  feet, it was partially rebuilt in 1964 then found structurally unsafe in 1990, when it was drained to less than 5% of its design capacity. The dam was reconstructed (with a new reinforcing gravity-dam element buttressing the original thin-arch structure) and refilled by popular demand.

The dam impounds the North Fork of the Tieton River, part of the Bureau's larger Yakima Project.  Its use is now primarily recreational.  Both dam and reservoir are owned and operated by the Bureau.

Recreation includes boating and fishing, and the site is surrounded by the southern tip of the Wenatchee National Forest. Also the YMCA of Yakima, Washington has Camp Dudley along its shores, a summer camp and retreat.

References

External links
 Camp Dudley

Dams in Washington (state)
Reservoirs in Washington (state)
United States Bureau of Reclamation dams
Dams completed in 1915
Lakes of Yakima County, Washington
Tributaries of the Yakima River